Károly Sándor (26 November 1928 – 10 September 2014) was a Hungarian international footballer who earned 75 caps between 1949 and 1964, scoring 27 goals. Sándor also participated in the World Cups in 1958 and 1962. Sándor, who played as a right winger, played club football for MTK.

References

1928 births
2014 deaths
Hungarian footballers
Hungary international footballers
1958 FIFA World Cup players
1962 FIFA World Cup players
MTK Budapest FC players
Sportspeople from Szeged
Association football wingers